Psalm 59 is the 59th psalm of the Book of Psalms, beginning in English in the King James Version: "Be merciful unto me, O God, be merciful unto me". In the slightly different numbering system of the Greek Septuagint version of the Bible and the Latin Vulgate, this psalm is Psalm 56. In Latin, it is known as "Eripe me de inimicis meis Deu". It is described as "a prayer composed when Saul sent messengers to wait at the house in order to kill him", and commentator Cyril Rodd describes it as a "vigorous plea for the destruction of the psalmist's enemies".

The psalm forms a regular part of Jewish, Catholic, Lutheran, Anglican and other Protestant liturgies. It has been set to music.

Text

Hebrew Bible version 
The following is the Hebrew text of Psalm 59:

King James Version 
 Deliver me from mine enemies, O my God: defend me from them that rise up against me.
 Deliver me from the workers of iniquity, and save me from bloody men.
 For, lo, they lie in wait for my soul: the mighty are gathered against me; not for my transgression, nor for my sin, O LORD.
 They run and prepare themselves without my fault: awake to help me, and behold.
 Thou therefore, O LORD God of hosts, the God of Israel, awake to visit all the heathen: be not merciful to any wicked transgressors. Selah.
 They return at evening: they make a noise like a dog, and go round about the city.
 Behold, they belch out with their mouth: swords are in their lips: for who, say they, doth hear?
 But thou, O LORD, shalt laugh at them; thou shalt have all the heathen in derision.
 Because of his strength will I wait upon thee: for God is my defence.
 The God of my mercy shall prevent me: God shall let me see my desire upon mine enemies.
 Slay them not, lest my people forget: scatter them by thy power; and bring them down, O Lord our shield.
 For the sin of their mouth and the words of their lips let them even be taken in their pride: and for cursing and lying which they speak.
 Consume them in wrath, consume them, that they may not be: and let them know that God ruleth in Jacob unto the ends of the earth. Selah.
 And at evening let them return; and let them make a noise like a dog, and go round about the city.
 Let them wander up and down for meat, and grudge if they be not satisfied.
 But I will sing of thy power; yea, I will sing aloud of thy mercy in the morning: for thou hast been my defence and refuge in the day of my trouble.
 Unto thee, O my strength, will I sing: for God is my defence, and the God of my mercy.

Heading 
To the Chief Musician. Set to "Do Not Destroy". A Michtam of David when Saul sent men, and they watched the house in order to kill him.
"Do Not Destroy", or Altaschith, may refer to an ancient song whose tune was to be used in singing the psalms.

Uses

Judaism 
Psalm 59 is one of the ten Psalms of the Tikkun HaKlali of Rebbe Nachman of Breslov.

Verse 18 (verse 17 in English translations) is found in the repetition of the Amidah during Rosh Hashanah.

Book of Common Prayer 
In the Church of England's Book of Common Prayer, this psalm is appointed to be read on the evening of the 11th day of the month.

Musical settings 
Heinrich Schütz set Psalm 59 in a metred version in German, "Hilf, Herre Gott, errette mich", SWV 156, as part of the Becker Psalter, first published in 1628.

References

External links 

 
 
  in Hebrew and English - Mechon-mamre
 Text of Psalm 59 according to the 1928 Psalter
 For the director. Do not destroy. A miktam of David, when Saul sent people to watch his house and kill him. / Rescue me from my enemies, my God; text and footnotes, usccb.org United States Conference of Catholic Bishops
 Psalm 59:1 introduction and text, biblestudytools.com
 Psalm 59 – Praise to My High Tower Against Assassins enduringword.com
 Psalm 59 Refrain: You, O God, are my strong tower. Church of England
 Psalm 59 at biblegateway.com
 Hymns for Psalm 59 hymnary.org

059
Works attributed to David